The 1962–63 Liga Bet season saw Hapoel Acre,  Hapoel Nahliel, YMCA Jerusalem and SK Nes Tziona win their regional divisions and promoted to Liga Alef.

Further twelve teams which have finished between second and fourth were also promoted, with one more promotion spot decided by a promotion play-off, as Liga Alef expanded from one to two regional divisions.

North Division A

North Division B

South Division A

South Division B

Promotion play-offs
A promotion-play off was played between all the teams which have finished in the 5th place in their respective regional division. the play-off format was of semi-finals and final match, played in neutral venue. the play-offs winner set to be promoted to Liga Alef.

Semi-final:

Final:

References
16 teams promoted from Liga Bet to Alef Maariv, 26.5.63, Historical Jewish Press 
Hapoel Herzliya - Beitar Haifa today in promotion play-off Davar, 22.10.63, Historical Jewish Press 
Hapoel Herzliya - Beitar Haifa 6-1 Davar, 23.10.63, Historical Jewish Press 
Bet leagues (Page 4) Hadshot HaSport, 30.5.63, archive.football.co.il 

Liga Bet seasons
Israel
3